Paskin is a surname. Notable people with the surname include:

John Paskin (born 1962), South African footballer 
Marc Paskin (born 1949), American businessman and television personality

See also
Laskin
Paskins
Raskin